Wedge Mountain,  prominence: , often locally referred to as The Wedge or simply "Wedge", is the highest summit in the Garibaldi Ranges and therefore also Garibaldi Provincial Park, and is among the nearest of the many peaks visible from the Whistler Blackcomb Ski Area, lying north across the valley of Billygoat Pass from the Spearhead Range, which includes one of that resort's two flagship mountains, Blackcomb. It was named for its distinctive wedge shape by the Garibaldi Park Board in 1932 in preference to Mount Vancouver, which had been submitted earlier.  It is part of an unnamed range forming the most northerly group of peaks in the Garibaldi Ranges, the other two most notable being Mount Weart, known as the Armchair because of its shape, and Mount Currie, which overlooks the First Nations Reserve of the same name and the neighbouring town of Pemberton.  Wedge's very high prominence is defined by the divide between the Green and Cheakamus Rivers at a locality at the south end of Alta Lake known as Tokum Corners.

The mountain sits astride the boundary between the New Westminster and Lillooet Land Districts.

Climbing and access

A  steep hike leads to a backcountry shelter and camping area at Wedgemount Lake, which is an approximately three-hour hike (without heavy gear) from a parking lot near the Wedgemont Green Lake railstop and track-crossing of the CNR. Across Wedgemount Lake from the cabin is the glacier, and above that the summit. The cabin, located at the North end of the lake, is at approximately  feet. There are multiple ways of approaching the summit. The more direct way is a knife-edge ridge called the Northeast Arete, which leads more or less directly to the summit, requiring  a full complement of winter mountaineering equipment. Another route that can be taken without such tools is the South face. This part can be seen from the valley, appearing to be a steep rock-covered slope. To approach the South face parties must climb over the glacier to the West Couloir, across the bottom of it and up to the left. Most of Wedge is in a provincial park, so helicopters are not allowed to drop people off there. In the early 1970s the glacier that now almost reaches the eastern end of Wedgemount Lake extended into the lake and at its terminus was approximately ten metres in height.

Climate
Based on the Köppen climate classification, Wedge Mountain is located in the marine west coast climate zone of western North America. Most weather fronts originate in the Pacific Ocean, and travel east toward the Coast Mountains where they are forced upward by the range (Orographic lift), causing them to drop their moisture in the form of rain or snowfall. As a result, the Coast Mountains experience high precipitation, especially during the winter months in the form of snowfall. The months July through September offer the most favorable weather for climbing.

See also

 Wedgemount Lake
 Mountain peaks of Canada
 Mountain peaks of North America

References

Two-thousanders of British Columbia
Whistler, British Columbia
Garibaldi Ranges
New Westminster Land District